A Village Looted at Night is an early 17th-century painting by Dutch artist Esaias van de Velde. Done in oil on panel and depicting the looting of a village, the painting is currently in the collection of the National Gallery of Denmark.

References 

1620 paintings
Dutch paintings